Vespa luctuosa is a species of hornet which is endemic to the Philippines. The main subspecies is Vespa luctuosa luctuosa (primarily native to Luzon island). Other known subspecies include Vespa luctuosa luzonensis (primarily native to the Visayas, including Leyte island and Samar Island) and Vespa luctuosa negrosensis (native to Negros island). Vespa luctuosa is known for its potent venom.

Venom characteristics

The venom of Vespa luctuosa has the highest recorded toxicity to mice of any wasp species tested. The  of the venom is 1.6 mg/kg. The toxicity (measured against mice) per weight of Vespa luctuosa venom is higher than that of the larger Asian giant hornet (Vespa mandarinia), which has an LD50 of 4.0 mg/kg, but which is responsible for many more human deaths than Vespa luctuosa due to the considerably larger volume of venom injected per sting.

In addition to being the most venomous known wasp, Vespa luctuosa has one of the highest recorded toxicities of any known insect venom. Only harvester ant venom from the genus Pogonomyrmex (especially Pogonomyrmex maricopa), as well as the unrelated ant species Ectatomma tuberculatum, are known to be more toxic.

In addition to pain at the sting site(s), symptoms of severe Vespa luctuosa envenomation include convulsions, cyanosis, and hematuria.

Nesting
Vespa luctuosa tends to build hanging nests in trees and bushes. It only rarely builds nests in human structures and dwellings. The nests built by Vespa luctuosa are generally spherical during the early stages of their construction. After the nests have developed in size, they tend to take a more elongated, vertical orientation.

References

External links
Images of Vespa luctuosa negrosensis

Vespidae
Hymenoptera of Asia
Insects of the Philippines
Endemic fauna of the Philippines
Insects described in 1854
Taxa named by Henri Louis Frédéric de Saussure